Wil Overton is a British artist, specialising in manga styles.

Career 
He has worked for a number of notable British video games magazines, including Super Play and N64 Magazine. He then worked at Rare and was an illustrator for NGamer magazine. After Overton drew the Perfect Dark cover for N64 Magazine at the time of the game's release, the manga-styled Joanna Dark design impressed Rare, and he was hired by the company as a result; the original cell-shaded designs for Perfect Dark Zero were based on this design, but later changed to more realistic graphics.

Since leaving Rare, Overton has been a freelance artist. He will provide art for the instruction manual of the Playtonic Games title, Yooka-Laylee.

See also 
Matt Bielby, video-game magazine editor
Julian Rignall, video-game magazine publisher
Helen McCarthy, Anime book author

External links 
Official website of Wil Overton

References 

British artists
Living people
Year of birth missing (living people)